Sainthia Junction railway station is one of the oldest stations in India serves Sainthia city of Birbhum district in the Indian state of West Bengal. It is a "NSG-5" category railway station. The railway station is under the administrative control of Howrah division of Eastern Railway. Sainthia Junction comes under the jurisdiction of Sainthia GRP Police Station. There is a total of 52 train arrivals and departures per day happening at this railway station. Sainthia Junction the 3rd busiest railway station in Birbhum district. This railway station is the busiest "NSG-5" category railway station in Howrah division and 6th busiest in all of NSG category railway stations in Howrah division. It also serves as the originating station of 4 important trains. In this station the famous Sainthia train collision took place between Uttar Banga Express and Vananchal Express

Trains
Some of the Major Trains available from this railway station are as follows:
 Sealdah-Alipurduar Kanchan Kanya Express
 Sealdah-Bamanhat Uttar Banga Express
 Sealdah–Silchar Kanchenjunga Express
 Sealdah–Agartala Kanchenjunga Express
 Sealdah-Rampurhat Maa Taara Express
 Ranchi Bhagalpur Vananchal Express
 Ranchi–Kamakhya Express
 Howrah Rampurhat Mayurkashi Express
 Howrah–Malda Town Intercity Express
 Howrah–Azimganj Kavi Guru Express
 Howrah-Azimganj Ganadevata Express
 Howrah-Radhikapur Kulik Express
 Howrah–Gaya Express

History

Construction of the Khana–Rajmahal section of Sahibganj loop was completed in October 1859. Construction of the Sainthia railway station was done as part of building the entire line and that was the start of the Sainthia railway station that year. The first passenger train journey from this station started on 1 September 1859. On 4 July 1860, train service started from Howrah to Rajmahal via Khana.

The Andal–Sainthia branch line was built in 1913.

Amenities

Amenities at Sainthia railway station include sheds, first-class and second-class waiting rooms, escalators, two over bridges, digital clock, CCTV camera, toilet and book stall.

Goods facilities

There were full rake goods sheds at the Sainthia railway station until 2018. Currently, it is used as a railway siding to load/unload material in the rakes.

References

Railway stations in Birbhum district
Railway stations in India opened in 1859
Howrah railway division
Railway junction stations in West Bengal